Villilä Studios is a Finnish film studio. It is located in the area of Villilä manor in Nakkila. The studio is also known as the Länsi-Suomen TV- ja elokuvakeskus and was founded in 2003.

Villilä manor became the property of the municipality of Nakkila in 2002. In the same year, the renovation of the manor's buildings into film studios began. The opening was held in February 2003. In addition to the interior, the area has a studio yard for outdoor photography, accommodation and restaurant services. The studio also has teaching facilities at the Sataedu Nakkila.

Films recorded in the studio

Sources 
 Villilä studios home page

References 

Finnish film studios
Mass media companies established in 2003
Nakkila
Film distributors
Finnish companies established in 2003
Film production companies of Finland